Hurricane Lester was a small but powerful tropical cyclone that caused heavy flooding in Central America and southern Mexico in October 1998. Lester was the fifteenth tropical cyclone, twelfth named storm and eighth hurricane of the 1998 Pacific hurricane season. Lester originated from a tropical wave that emerged off the coast of Africa on September 29. Under favorable conditions, the storm was classified as a tropical depression on October 15. The depression was upgraded to a tropical storm later that day and a hurricane on October 16. After several days, it degenerated into a tropical storm on October 26, and dissipated shortly after. The hurricane made its closest approach to land on October 28, producing moderate winds and heavy rainfall. A mudslide triggered by the precipitation killed two children, although damage is unknown.

Meteorological history

A tropical wave moved off the coast of Africa on September 29, 1998, and on October 5, an area of convection along the wave developed into Atlantic Hurricane Lisa. The system drifted northwestward, and as convection increased around the center a banding featured began to develop. At 0000 UTC on October 15, the National Hurricane Center designated it as Tropical Depression Fourteen-E. The depression contained a large envelope of convective activity, and under favorable conditions including warm water, low vertical wind shear and good outflow, it gradually began to intensify. Initially, the exact direction of forward movement was somewhat uncertain, although a northwestward track was predicted. On the morning of October 15, visible satellite imagery suggested that the center of circulation was located northeast of the previous estimates. Thunderstorm activity organized close to the center by 1400 UTC, and by 1800 UTC the depression was upgraded to Tropical Storm Lester.

Shortly thereafter, the storm took a slight jog to the west, and at the same time outflow became restricted to the southwest of the circulation. At 1400 UTC on October 16, data from a Reconnaissance Aircraft confirmed that the storm had attained hurricane intensity with a minimum central pressure of 992 mb. Shortly after, the hurricane became nearly stationary due to a shortwave which passed north of the system, shortly before reaching Category 2 status on the Saffir-Simpson Hurricane Scale. Early on October 18, the eye began to wobble slightly and the ring of cold cloud tops were showing signs of disorganization, slowing further intensification for several hours. Later that day, it weakened to Category 1 status, although quickly re-intensified.

Vertical wind shear associated with a mid-to-upper-level low pressure system developed and began to affect the storm's circulation on October 19, thus weakening it slightly. However, early on October 20 the hurricane regained organization and once again intensified. Coinciding with its peak intensity, a shortwave trough caused Lester to stall before turning to the southwest and weakening. At 0200 UTC on October 23 Lester rapidly lost deep convection, and weakened to Category 1 status. Later that morning, the storm was downgraded to a tropical storm while tracking southwest.

Preparations and impact

In anticipation of the storm, the government of Mexico issued a hurricane warning from Puerto Arista to Punta Maldonaldo and later from Salina Cruz to Acapulco. A tropical storm warning was also issued from Sipacate, Guatemala to Puerto Arista, Mexico. The threat of the hurricane prompted officials to order the evacuation of 3,000 people along the southern coast of Mexico to 500 emergency shelters.

The storm dropped heavy rainfall across southwestern Guatemala. Moisture brought around the northeast periphery of the Sierra Madre Occidental led to a narrow band of heavy rainfall along the upslope side of the mountain range, with a local precipitation maximum exceeding . It is reported that tropical-storm-force winds occurred along coastal areas of southern Mexico. The rainfall destroyed some houses and killed numerous livestock, and triggered a mudslide which killed two children. In Honduras, rainfall from Lester destroyed a bridge which affected transportation for about 1,000 people. Heavy rainfall was reported in  Chiapas, causing moderate river flooding though no reported damage.

See also

Other tropical cyclones name Lester
List of Pacific hurricanes

References

External links
National Hurricane Center's Tropical Cyclone Report

Category 3 Pacific hurricanes
1998 Pacific hurricane season
Hurricane Lester